William A. Wilson may refer to:

William A. Wilson (diplomat)
William A. Wilson (folklorist)

See also
William Wilson (disambiguation)